"Round Midnight" (sometimes titled "Round About Midnight") is a 1943 composition by American jazz pianist Thelonious Monk that quickly became a jazz standard and has been recorded by a wide variety of artists. A version recorded by Monk's quintet was added to the Grammy Hall of Fame in 1993. It is one of the most recorded jazz standards composed by a jazz musician.

Composition and Monk's first recording
It is thought that Monk composed the song sometime in 1940 or 1941. However, Monk's longtime manager Harry Colomby claims the pianist may have written an early version around 1936 (at the age of 19). The song was copyrighted September 24, 1943 in C minor under the title "I Need You So", with lyrics by a friend of Monk's named Thelma Murray. The first recording was made by Cootie Williams on August 22, 1944, after the pianist Bud Powell persuaded Williams to record the tune. Monk first recorded the song on November 21, 1947. It later appeared on the Blue Note album Genius of Modern Music: Volume 1, and Monk recorded it several times after that. His first version was transcribed by Lionel Grigson in A Thelonious Monk Study Album (Novello, 1993).

Jazz trumpeters Cootie Williams and Dizzy Gillespie further embellished the song, with songwriter Bernie Hanighen adding his own lyrics. Williams composed an eight bar interlude, played by the ensemble on his recording. This interlude is not included on any of Monk's recordings and is rarely if ever played. The lyrics were copyrighted November 27, 1944 and again April 13, 1945 under the title "Grand Finale". Both Williams and Hanighen received co-credits for their contributions. The commonly played intro to "Round Midnight" was originally composed by Dizzy Gillespie for the end of his arrangement for "I Can't Get Started", but later adopted it to the intro for "Round Midnight". Gillespie later reused the arrangement for "I Can't Get Started", and recorded it for Birks' Works and Something Old, Something New.

Later versions
The song is sometimes incorrectly called "Round About Midnight", as Miles Davis used this as the title of his 1957 Columbia Records album 'Round About Midnight that included a version based on Dizzy Gillespie's arrangement. It became a signature song for Davis; his performance of it with Monk at the 1955 Newport Jazz Festival, which was heard by producer George Avakian, was crucial in securing him a recording contract with Columbia Records. He had previously recorded the song in the studio two other times, once for Prestige in 1953 and again in 1956 as released on Miles Davis and the Modern Jazz Giants. Art Blakey & the Jazz Messengers also apparently preferred to use the title "'Round About Midnight", as opposed to the original "'Round Midnight", in several recordings they made of the song.

A recording by Jimmy McGriff was used as the 6pm closedown theme in the early days of Radio Caroline in 1964.

In 1971, Ron Grainer used a down-tempo variation by Cootie Williams to accompany a memorable scene from The Omega Man. The song later appeared on a 2004 Gotan Project CD, Inspiración Espiración, featuring Chet Baker.

In 1986, the song was used as the title for the film Round Midnight which starred veteran saxophonist Dexter Gordon in a fictional story about an expatriate American jazz musician living in Paris. The soundtrack by Herbie Hancock prominently features the song Round Midnight" along with a number of other jazz standards and a handful of original pieces written by Hancock.

In 2002, Italian pianist Emanuele Arciuli commissioned a number of composers to create the Round Midnight Variations. The composers included Roberto Andreoni, Milton Babbitt, Alberto Barbero, Carlo Boccadoro, William Bolcom, David Crumb, George Crumb, Michael Daugherty, Filippo Del Corno, John Harbison, Joel Hoffman, Aaron Jay Kernis, Gerald Levinson, Tobias Picker, Matthew Quayle, Frederic Rzewski, Augusta Read Thomas and Michael Torke.

Notable recordings

By Monk

By others

References

Sources

Further reading

1944 songs
1940s jazz standards
Songs with music by Thelonious Monk
Ella Fitzgerald songs
Andy Williams songs
Grammy Award for Best Jazz Vocal Performance, Male
Jazz songs
Bebop jazz standards
Jazz compositions in E-flat minor